Three referendums were held in Liechtenstein during 1927. The first two were held on 30 January and consisted of an initiative to liberalise the building industry and a counterproposal from the Landtag. Both were rejected by a majority of voters. The third was held on 1 May on the subject of amending the law on salaries and compensation. It was also rejected.

Results

Building industry liberalisation initiative

Building industry liberalisation counterproposal

Amendment of the law on salaries and compensation

References

1927 referendums
1927 in Liechtenstein
Referendums in Liechtenstein